Palgrave is a surname. Notable people with the surname include:

Sir Francis Palgrave (born Cohen) (1768–1861), UK historian, and his sons:
 Francis Turner Palgrave (1824–1897),  British critic and poet
 William Gifford Palgrave (1826–1888), scholar of Arabic
 Sir Robert Harry Inglis Palgrave (1827–1919), banker, editor of The Economist and writer
 Sir Reginald Francis Douce Palgrave (1829–1904), Clerk of the British House of Commons

See also
John Palsgrave (died 1554), English scholar